Thomas J. Vasel is a podcaster, designer and reviewer of board games, and hosted The Dice Tower podcast from 2003-2022, which has more than 300,000 subscribers. Vasel began publishing board game reviews in 2002 on BoardGameGeek, followed by YouTube, and his Dice Tower website. As of 2021, he has rated over 7000 games and expansions. His first board game review was for The Settlers of Canaan. 

Vasel was the designer of the board game Vicious Fishes in 2010, and co-designer for the boardgame Nothing Personal in 2013.

One of his children, Jack Vasel, died in 2011, resulting in Vasel establishing the Jack Vasel Memorial Fund, a not-for-profit fund with the goal of raising and distributing funds to help gamers in their hour of need.

References

American podcasters
Board game designers
1976 births
Living people